Bano Qudsia (‎; 28 November 19284 February 2017), also known as Bano Aapa, was a Pakistani novelist, playwright and spiritualist. She wrote literature in Urdu, producing novels, dramas plays and short stories. Qudsia is best recognized for her novel Raja Gidh. Qudsia also wrote for television and stage in both Urdu and Punjabi languages. Her play Aadhi Baat has been called "a classic play". Bano Qudsia died in Lahore on 4 February 2017.

Personal life

Bano Qudsia was born on 28 November 1928 in Firozpur, British India, as Qudsia Chattha in a Muslim Jat family. Her father was a Bachelor of Agriculture and her brother Pervaiz Chattha was a painter. She migrated to Lahore with her family after the partition of India and had begun writing short stories while studying in class 5. She graduated from the Kinnaird College in Lahore and then joined the Government College University (Lahore) (GCU) to earn her master's degree in Urdu literature which she completed in 1951.

Qudsia married writer Ashfaq Ahmed whom she had met at the Government College University (Lahore). They had three sons Aneeque, Anees and Aseer. The couple had been considered inseparable in their social lives.

Literary work
Qudsia's novel Raja Gidh (The King Vulture) is considered a modern Urdu classic. Among her more prominent writings are Aatish-i-zer-i-paa, Aik Din, Asay Pasay, Chahar Chaman, Chhotaa Sheher Baray Log, Footpath ki Ghaas, Haasil Ghaat and Hawa Kay Naam. The most well known plays she wrote include Tamasil, Hawa ke Naam, Seharay and Khaleej.

Her critically acclaimed play Aadhi Baat was about a retired headmaster. The play examined the headmaster's day-to-day life problems and had Qavi Khan acting as the lead character. The play's director was Agha Nasir and it was produced by Tauqeer Nasir. Aadhi Baat was performed in May 2010 in Islamabad at a three-day event which was organized by the Pakistan National Council of the Arts. Ashfaq Ahmed's autobiography Baba Saheba was incomplete at the time of his death in September 2004. Qudsia completed the biography and the second part of it was published as Rah-i-Rawaan. The contrast in the narrative styles of the couple is evident in these two books; while the first half is considered "provoking, lucid and utterly spellbinding" by critics, the second half takes the feeling of sorrow. Qudsia credits Ahmed for transforming her after their marriage and eventually allowing her to devote to her writing. Qudsia's novel Raah-e-Rawaan  was published in 2011. It is an analytical look at Ashfaq Ahmed's philosophical thinking and how it may relate to certain aspects of life itself. Qudsia had the highest regards for her husband and she has placed Ashfaq Ahmed on a very high pedestal. However she does not even claim to understand the man she lived with for more than five decades. So, an attempt at writing the biography of Ashfaq Ahmed took her beyond that ‘one person’— and she started to write about his ancestry, the family including his grandfather, father, uncles, brothers, sisters and their children so as to fully understand the enigma that was Ashfaq Ahmed.

Qudsia's novel Haasil Ghaat was published in 2005 and was noted for its diction but also criticized then for usages of English slangs than her usual traditional Urdu narrative. The language however became popular amongst other writers in future.

Bano Qudsia also wrote a book about Qudrat Ullah Shahab titled "Mard-e-Abresham" . The book mainly portrays Shahab's life and how it was connected with Ashfaq Ahmed and his family both on social and spiritual level.
Baba Mohammad Yahya Khan was much inspired by Maa jee Bano Qudsia and Baba jee Ashfaq Ahmed.

Death
Bano Qudsia died on 4 February 2017 at the Ittefaq Hospital in Lahore at the age of 88. Her son Aseer Ahmed informed that she died around the time for Maghrib prayers (after sunset). She was buried at Lahore on 5 February and prayer services were held at Model Town, Lahore.

Awards and recognition
In 1983, Qudsia was awarded the Sitara-i-Imtiaz (Star of Excellence) by the Government of Pakistan. In 1986 she received PTV Best Writer Award. In 2010, the Pakistani government awarded her the Hilal-i-Imtiaz (Crescent of Excellence) for her services in literature. In 2012, the Pakistan Academy of Letters (PAL) awarded Qudsia the Kamal-e-Fun Award, which is a lifetime achievement award. In 2016, the GCU's Old Ravians Union (GCU-ORU) at its annual reunion conferred on her a lifetime achievement award. The same year, the Pakistan Life Care Foundation (PLCF) also awarded the lifetime achievement award to Qudsia.

On 28 November 2020, Google celebrated her 92nd birthday with a Google Doodle.

Books

Dramas
 Chota Shehar Baray Log 
 Phir Achanak Youn Hua 
 Lagan Apni Apni 
 Aadhee Baat 
 Foot Paath Ki Ghaas 
 Aasay Paasay
 Tamaseel
 Hawa kay Naam
 Dusra Qadam
 Sidhran
 Suraj Mukhi
 Piya Nam ka Diya
Novels
 Raja Gidh 
 Aik Din 
 Haasil Ghaat 
 Shehr-e-la'zawaal – Abaad Weeranay 
 Purwa
 Moom ki Galiyan
 Shehr-e-Bemisaal
 Tauba Shikan

Short stories
 Hijraton Kay Darmiyan 
 Dast Bastaa 
 Aatish e Zeer Pa
 Amar Bail
 Dusra Darwaza
 Baz Gasht
 Na Qabil e Zikr
 Samaan e Wajood
 Tawaja ki Taalib
 Kuch Aur Nahi
Biographies
 Rah-e-Rawaan 
 Mard-e-Abresham

See also
 List of Urdu-language writers

References

1928 births
2017 deaths
Punjabi people
Kinnaird College for Women University alumni
Writers from Lahore
Pakistani women philosophers
Government College University, Lahore alumni
Pakistani dramatists and playwrights
Women dramatists and playwrights
Punjabi-language writers
Pakistani women novelists
Pakistani novelists
20th-century Pakistani philosophers
20th-century dramatists and playwrights
20th-century Pakistani novelists
21st-century Pakistani philosophers
21st-century dramatists and playwrights
21st-century Pakistani novelists
20th-century Pakistani women writers
21st-century Pakistani women writers
Pakistani scholars
Urdu-language writers
Urdu-language novelists
Recipients of Sitara-i-Imtiaz
Recipients of Hilal-i-Imtiaz
PTV Award winners